The Universidade Lusíada de Angola, also known as U.L.A. was an Angolan semi-professional basketball team which is named after its major sponsor, the Angolan Lusíadas University. 

The men's team made its debut at the Angolan premier basketball league (BAI Basket) at the 2006–07 season whereas the women's team was established in February 2014 as it took over Juventude de Viana's women's basketball team, following the latter's disbanding.

They stayed in the BAI Basket for ten straight seasons, before the team was forced to leave the competition in November 2021. Vice President Paulo Murais cited financial problems that had been going on for seven years, with the economic crisis due to the COVID-19 pandemic being the final blow.

Players

2014–2018

2014–2015

See also
Angola Women's Basketball League
Federação Angolana de Basquetebol

References

External links
ULA official website
Facebook profile
Africabasket profile

Sports clubs in Angola
Basketball teams in Angola
Basketball teams disestablished in 2021
Basketball teams established in 2007
Defunct basketball teams in Angola
2007 establishments in Angola
2021 disestablishments in Africa